SilhouetteFX began as a rotoscoping tool for the visual effects industry. SilhouetteFX has been expanded to include capabilities facilitating paint, warping and morphing, 2D to 3D conversion and alternative matting methods. As of V6, SilhouetteFX retains all of the aforementioned capabilities now embedded in a node-based digital compositing application.

Version history 

Silhouette v1.0 - Feb 2005: Silhouette ships with b-splines, bezier splines and point tracking

Silhouette v2.0 - Jul 2005: Added raster paint, layers, match-move, stabilization

Silhouette v3.0 – Aug 2008: Added fully stereoscopic workflow, planar tracking, x-splines, comprehensive keyer

Silhouette v4.0 - Mar 2010: Added Power Matte semi-automatic matting system, rewrote planar tracker, open shapes, scripting, commandline rendering, dual-clone painting.

Silhouette v4.1 - Feb 2011: Planar Tracker rewritten again to be more robust with less user interaction

Silhouette v4.5 - Jan 2012: Added OpenColorIO color management

Silhouette v5.0 - Jan 2013: 2D->3D conversion tools, inverse kinematics for roto, shape-based warping and morphing, raster paint history and auto-paint features with match-move

Silhouette v5.2 - Jul 2014: Crop node, EXR 2 support, Automation Paint enhancements.

Silhouette v6.0 - Nov 2016: Node based GPU accelerated compositor with total of 136 different nodes--all stereo enabled.

Silhouette v7.0 - Jun 2018: Sequence Editing, Planar Tracker enhanced to track textureless objects, roto and paint enhancements.

Silhouette v2020 - Nov 2019: Paint > Detail Separation workflow, Paint plug-in, Magnetic Freehand roto shapes, Roto Overlay, Weighted Keyframes, Group/Part Planar Tracking.

Silhouette v2021 - Apr 2021: Silhouette plug-in, Lens Correction, Movie file format support, Advanced Roto Tools: Brush Reshape, Collapse/Distribute Points, Point Groups, Split Shapes, Roto Review and Approval, Weighted MultiFrame.

Silhouette 2022 - June 2022: Sapphire, Mocha Pro, Particle Illusion and select Continuum BCC+ filters included; Inpaint, Power Mesh, Point control parameter tracking, Cryptomatte.

Context 

SilhouetteFX is named for the art form associated with Étienne de Silhouette (July 8, 1709 – 1767). The fundamental output of a rotoscoping program is a matte which when viewed appears as a silhouette of an object to be treated in isolation of the remainder of an image. The image density of the matte determines how a compositing operation effect will be applied. Image pixels corresponding to brighter pixels in the matte will be treated differently than image pixels corresponding to darker pixels in the matte vfx.

Company 
The developer, SilhouetteFX LLC, was formed as a partnership between principals from Digital Film Tools and Profound Effects, Inc. Partners include Paul Miller, Marco Paolini, Peter Moyer and Perry Kivolowitz.

In 2019, Boris FX, a leading developer of VFX, compositing, titling, video editing, and workflow tools for broadcast, post-production, and film professionals acquired SilhouetteFX.

Awards 
2019 Academy Award for Technical Achievement - Academy of Motion Picture Arts and Sciences

2019 Engineering Emmy - Academy of Television Arts & Sciences

Partial List of Notable Films 

 30 Days of Night (2007): Weta
 47 Ronin (2013): Framestore
1917 (2019): MPC Film
 A Monster Calls (2016): MPC Film
 A Wrinkle in Time (2018): MPC Film
 Abraham Lincoln: Vampire Hunter (2012): Weta
Ad Astra (2019): MPC Film, Weta
 After Party (2017): BOT VFX
 Age of Adaline (2015): BOT VFX
 Alien Covenant (2017): Framestore, MPC Film
 All the Money in the World (2017): MPC Film
 Alvin and the Chipmunks: The Road Chip (2015): Weta
 American Sniper (2014): MPC Film
Aquaman (2018): MPC Film
 Arrival (2016): Framestore
Artemis Fowl (2020): MPC Film
 Avatar (2009): Framestore
 Avengers: Age of Ultron (2015): Framestore
Avengers: Endgame (2019): Framestore, Weta
 Avengers: Infinity War (2018): Framestore, Weta
 Batman vs Superman: Dawn of Justice (2016): MPC Film, Weta
 Beauty and the Beast (2017): Framestore
 Bedtime Stories (2008): Tippett Studio
 Ben Hur (2016): BOT VFX
 Beverly Hills Chihuahua (2008): Tippett Studio
Black Widow (2021): Weta
 Blade Runner 2049 (2017): Framestore, MPC Film
 Bridge to Terabithia (2007): Weta
Captain Marvel (2019): Framestore
 Cats & Dogs: The Revenge of Kitty Galore (2010): Tippett Studio
 Clash of the Titans (2010): Framestore
 Cloverfield (2008): Tippett Studio
 Coraline (2009): Laika
Cruella (2021): MPC Film
 Dawn of the Planet of the Apes (2014): Weta
Deadpool 2 (2018): Framestore, Weta
 District 9 (2009): Weta
Dolittle (2020): MPC Film
 Dracula Untold (2014): Framestore
 Drag Me to Hell (2009): Tippett Studio
Dumbo (2019): Framestore, MPC Film
 Edge of Tomorrow (2014): Framestore, MPC Film
 Enchanted (2007): Tippett Studio
 Eragon (2006): Weta
 Everest (2015): Framestore
 Ex Machina (2015): Double Negative
 Fantastic Beasts (2016): MPC Film
Fantastic Beasts: The Crimes of Grindelwald (2018): Framestore
 Fantastic Four (2015): Weta, BOT VFX
 Fantastic Four: Rise of the Silver Surfer (2007): Weta
Fast & Furious Presents: Hobbs & Shaw (2019): Framestore
 Fifty Shades Darker (2017): MPC Film
 Fifty Shades Freed (2018): Anibrain
 Furious Seven (2015): Weta
Gemini Man (2019): Weta
 Guardians of the Galaxy Vol. 2 (2017): Framestore, Weta
 Geostorm (2017): Framestore
 Ghost in the Shell (2017): Framestore, MPC Film
 Ghostbusters (2016): MPC Film
 Gods of Egypt (2016): BOT VFX
 Godzilla (2014): Double Negative
 Godzilla (2016): MPC Film
Godzilla: King of the Monsters (2019): MPC Film
Godzilla vs. Kong (2021): Weta
 Gravity (2013): Framestore
 Guardians of the Galaxy (2014): Framestore
 Gulliver's Travels (2010): Weta
 Harry Potter and the Deathly Hallows: Part 1 (2010): Rising Sun Pictures, Framestore
 Harry Potter and the Deathly Hallows: Part 2" (2011): Framestore, Rising Sun Pictures, Tippett Studio
 Hateful Eight (2015): BOT VFX
 Hunger Games: Mockingjay - Part 2 (2015): BOT VFX
 Immortals (2011): Tippett Studio
 Independence Day: Resurgence (2016): MPC Film, BOT VFX
 Interstellar (2014): Double Negative
 Into The Woods (2014): MPC Film
 Jack the Giant Killer (2013): Image Engine
 Jersey Boys (2014): MPC Film
 John Carter (2012): Double Negative
 Jupiter Ascending (2015): Double Negative
 Jumanji: Welcome to the Jungle (2017): Kaizen LLP
Jumanji: The Next Level (2019): Weta
 Jumper (2008): Weta
Jungle Cruise (2021): Weta
 Jupiter Ascending (2015): Framestore
 Jurassic World (2015): StereoD
 Justice League (2017): MPC Film, Weta
 King Arthur: Legend of the Sword (2017): Framestore, MPC Film
 King Kong (2005): Weta
 Kingsman: The Golden Circle (2017): MPC Film
 Knight and Day (2010): Weta
 Magnificent 7 (2016): BOT VFX
 Maleficent (2014): MPC Film
Maleficent: Mistress of Evil (2019): MPC Film
 Man of Steel (2013): Weta
Mary Poppins Returns (2018): Framestore
 Maze Runner: Scorch Trials (2015): Weta
 Maze Runner: The Death Cure (2018): Weta
 Mirror Mirror (2012): Tippett Studio
 Miss Peregrine's Home for Peculiar Children (2016): BOT VFX, MPC Film
 Mission Impossible-Rogue Nation (2015): Double Negative
 Monster Trucks (2016): MPC Film
Mortal Engines (2018): Weta
Mowgli: Legend of the Jungle (2018): Framestore
Mulan (2020): Weta
 Murder on the Orient Express (2017): MPC Film
 Nanny McPhee Returns (2010): Framestore
 Night at the Museum: Secret of the Tomb (2014): MPC Film
 Now You See Me 2 (2016): Framestore
 Paddington (2014): Framestore, Double Negative
 Pan (2015): Framestore
 Passengers (2016): MPC Film
 Percy Jackson: Sea Monsters (2013): Weta
 Pete's Dragon (2016): Weta, BOT VFX
 Piranha (2010): Tippett Studio
 Pirates of the Caribbean: Dead Men Tell No Tales (2017): MPC Film
 Pixels (2015): BOT VFX
 Point Break (2015): BOT VFX
 Predators (2010): Weta
 Priest (2011): Tippett Studio
 Prometheus (2012): Weta
 Rampage (2018): Weta
 R.I.P.D. (2013)
 Red 2 (2013): MPC Film
 Red Cliff (2008): Tippett Studio
 Rise of the Planet of the Apes (2011): Weta
 Robocop (2014): Framestore
 Rush (2013): Double Negative
 Salt (2010): Framestore
 Season of the Witch (2011): Tippett Studio
Shang-Chi and the Legend of the Ten Rings (2021): Weta
 Sherlock Holmes: Game of Shadows (2013): Framestore
 Skyfall (2012): Double Negative
 Skyscraper (2018): MPC Film
Sonic the Hedgehog (2020): MPC Film
Spider-Man: Far from Home (2019): Framestore
 Straight Outta Compton (2015): BOT VFX
 Suicide Squad (2016): MPC Film
 Sully (2016): MPC Film
 Tarzan (2016): MPC Film, Framestore
 Ted (2012): Tippett Studio
 Teenage Mutant Ninja Turtles: Out of the Shadows (2016): BOT VFX
 Teenage Mutant Ninja Turtles (2014)
Terminator: Dark Fate (2019): Weta
 Terminator Genisys (2015): Double Negative, MPC Film
 The 5th Wave (2016): BOT VFX
 The A-Team (2010): Weta
 The Adventures of Tintin (2011): Weta
 The Avengers (2012): Weta
 The BFG (2016): Weta
 The Boss (2016): BOT VFX
 The Chronicles of Narnia: Prince Caspian (2008): Weta
 The Chronicles of Narnia: The Voyage of the Dawn Treader (2011): MPC Film
 The Counselor (2013): MPC Film
 The Dark Knight (2008): Double Negative
 The Dark Tower (2017): MPC Film
 The Day the Earth Stood Still (2008): Weta
 The Dinner (2017): BOT VFX
 The Finest Hours (2016): MPC Film
 The Golden Compass (2007): Tippett Studio, Framestore
 The Greatest Showman (2017): MPC Film
 The Gunman (2015): Double Negative
 The Hobbit: An Unexpected Journey (2012): Weta
 The Hobbit: The Battle of the Five Armies (2014): Weta
 The Hobbit: The Desolation of Smaug (2013): Weta
 The Hunger Games: Catching Fire (2013): Double Negative / Weta
 The Jungle Book (2016): Weta
The King's Man (2021): Framestore 
 The Lake (2017): BOT VFX
 The Legend of Tarzan (2016): MPC Film
 The Lion King (2019): MPC Film
 The Lone Ranger (2013): MPC Film
 The Lovely Bones (2009): Weta
 The Martian (2015): BOT VFX, Framestore
 The Mountain Between Us (2017): MPC Film
 The Mummy (2017): MPC Film
 The Nutcracker and the Four Realms (2018): MPC Film
 The Predator (2018): MPC Film
 The Secret Life of Walter Mitty (2013): MPC Film
 The Smurfs (2011): Tippett Studio
 The Spiderwick Chronicles (2008): Tippett Studio
The Suicide Squad (2021): Weta
The Tomorrow War (2021): Weta
 The Twilight Saga: Breaking Dawn - Part 1 (2011): Tippett Studio
 The Twilight Saga: Breaking Dawn - Part 2 (2012): Tippett Studio
 The Twilight Saga: Eclipse (2010): Tippett Studio
 The Twilight Saga: New Moon (2009): Tippett Studio
 The Water Horse: Legend of the Deep (2007): Weta
 The Wolverine (2013): Weta
 The World's End (2013): Double Negative
 Thor: Ragnarok (2017): Framestore
 Titanic 3D (2012): StereoD
 Total Recall (2012): Double Negative
 Transformers: The Last Knight (2017): MPC Film
 Underwater (2020): MPC Film
 Victor Frankenstein (2015): MPC Film
 War Horse (2011): Framestore
Skyscraper (2018): MPC Film
 Spectral (2017): Weta
 Where the Wild Things Are (2009): Framestore
 Valerian and the City of a Thousand Planets (2017): Weta
 War for the Planet of the Apes (2017): Weta
 Wonder Woman (2017): MPC Film
 World War Z (2013): MPC Film
 X-Men: The Last Stand (2006): Weta
 X-Men: Apocalypse (2016): MPC Film
X-Men: Dark Phoenix (2019): MPC Film
 X-Men: First Class (2011): Weta
 xXx: The Return of Xander Cage (2017): MPC Film
Zack Snyder's Justice League (2021): Weta
 Zoolander 2 (2016): MPC Film

References

External links 
 SilhoutteFX web site

Compositing software